Lü Jun (born 1967) is a Chinese executive and politician, currently serving as chairman and party branch secretary of the COFCO Corporation.

He was a representative of the 19th National Congress of the Chinese Communist Party and is a representative of the 20th National Congress of the Chinese Communist Party.

He was an alternate member of the 19th Central Committee of the Chinese Communist Party and is an alternate member of the 20th Central Committee of the Chinese Communist Party.

Biography 
Lü was born in Shulu County (now Xinji), Hebei, in 1967, and graduated from China Agricultural University.

Beginning in 1993, he served in several posts in the COFCO Corporation, including deputy general manager, general manager, and vice president.

References 

1967 births
Living people
People from Xinji
China Agricultural University alumni
People's Republic of China politicians from Hebei
Chinese Communist Party politicians from Hebei
Alternate members of the 19th Central Committee of the Chinese Communist Party
Alternate members of the 20th Central Committee of the Chinese Communist Party